Mehmet Akif Ersoy Indoor Swimming Pool, is an indoor aquatics venue located in Bostancı neighborhood of Trabzon, Turkey.

The Olympic-size swimming pool was constructed between 2009 and 2011 at a cost of  16 million (approx. $ 10 million) to host the swimming events at the 2011 European Youth Summer Olympic Festival. The pool with  length and  width has ten lanes. There is a diving tower at the pool. It can hold 1,400 spectators.

The building has a 140 tonne heavy retractable roof with two wings, which can be opened up in 10 minutes.

References

Sports venues in Trabzon
Swimming venues in Turkey
Sports venues completed in 2011